Said Salim Al-Ruzaiqi (born 12 December 1986), commonly known as Said Al-Ruzaiqi or Al-Shalhoub, is an Oman international footballer who plays as a striker.

Club career
On 1 September 2014, he signed a one-year contract with 2013–14 Oman Professional League winners Al-Nahda Club.

Club career statistics

International career

Said is part of the first team squad of the Oman national football team. He was selected for the national team for the first time in 2014. He made his first appearance for Oman on 17 November 2014 in the 22nd Arabian Gulf Cup in the match against Iraq, and scored his first goal on 20 November 2014 in a 5−0 win against Kuwait in the same tournament. It was just his second international match for Oman, and he impressed many with his scoring abilities by netting two more goals in the match, thus becoming the first and the only player in the 22nd Arabian Gulf Cup to score a hat-trick. He played his first full match for Oman on 25 November 2014 in the Third place play-off of the 22nd Arabian Gulf Cup in a 1−0 loss against the United Arab Emirates.

National team career statistics

Goals for Senior National Team
Scores and results list Oman's goal tally first.

References

External links
 
 Said Al-Ruzaiqiat Goal.com 
 
 
 Said Al-Ruzaiqi - ASIAN CUP Australia 2015

Al-Arabi SC (Kuwait) players
1986 births
Living people
People from Sur, Oman
Omani footballers
Oman international footballers
Association football forwards
2015 AFC Asian Cup players
Al-Tali'aa SC players
Muscat Club players
Sur SC players
Al-Orouba SC players
Al-Nahda Club (Oman) players
Al-Tai FC players
Oman Professional League players
Kuwait Premier League players
Saudi First Division League players
Expatriate footballers in Kuwait
Omani expatriate sportspeople in Kuwait
Expatriate footballers in Saudi Arabia
Omani expatriate sportspeople in Saudi Arabia